The Spectrum is a student newspaper published in Buffalo, New York.  It is published once a week at the University at Buffalo.

The Spectrum began publishing in 1950 and has since become the largest student-run newspaper in the SUNY state school system. The paper is located at 132 Student Union at the University at Buffalo. It is printed at an off-site press but distributed to multiple areas on the university's North and South campuses. New editions are distributed every Monday and Thursday during the fall and spring school semesters. Each issue prints 4,000 copies that are read by approximately 21,000 people. The paper employs over 50 UB students, as well as members of the Western New York community.

The Spectrum is financially independent and supports itself with print and online advertising. Much like a major newspaper, its sections are divided into life and arts, sports, local and national news, photo journalism, and the editorial page. 	

Because The Spectrum is a student-run newspaper, any undergraduate is eligible to register for the newspaper and its corresponding English courses, regardless of intended major.

Students who choose to write for the paper are trained in Associated Press-style writing, editing and newspaper layout. Additionally, all writers and editors are trained in journalism ethics.

Faculty
The Spectrum is advised by Matt Parrino from the Syracuse Post Standard, who is an adjunct instructor though the English department. Jody Biehl, the former director of the school's Journalism Certificate Program, was the paper's advisor from 2009-2021.

Editors in Chief:
 2022-2023: Anthony DeCicco
 2021-2022: Reilly Mullen
 2020: Alexandra Moyen
 2019-2020: Brenton J. Blanchet
 2017-2019: Hannah Stein 
 2016-2017: Gabriela Julia
 2015-2016: Tom Dinki
 2014-2015: Sara DiNatale
 2012-2014: Aaron Mansfield
 2011-2012: Matt Parrino
 2010-2011: Andrew Wiktor
 2009-2010: Stephen Marth
 2008-2009: Stephanie Sciandra
 2007-2008: Silas Rader
 2006-2007: Robert Pape
 2005-2006: Jeremy G. Burton
 2004-2005: George Zornick
 2003-2004: Erin Shultz
 2002-2003: Sara Paulson
1997-1999:Josh Walker
1996-1997: Steve Watson
1995-1996: Bonnie Butkus
1994-1995: Hakeem Oseni
 1993-1994: Joe Sbarra
 1992-1993: Keith McShea
 1991-1992: Tracey Rosenthal
 1990-1991: Ian Aronson
 1989-1990: Bill Sheridan
 1988-1989: Gerry Weiss
 1987-1988: Ken Lovett
 1986-1987: Brad Pick
 1970-1971 Jo-Ann Armao
 1969-1970 James Brennan 
 1968-1969 Linda Hanley

Notable alumni
Tom Toles, cartoonist (The Washington Post)
Howard Kurtz, author and journalist (CNN, The Daily Beast)
Jay Rosen, media critic, writer, and journalism professor at New York University
 Jo-Ann Armao, formerly assistant managing editor for metro news and now editorial writer at The Washington Post 
 Harvy Lipman (b.1950 - d.2014), senior writer and columnist at The Record in northern New Jersey.
 Matt Parrino, Buffalo Bills beat reporter, former digital media director at Ultimate Fighting Championship and former sports editor at Tonawanda News.
Lauren Nostro, former editor at Complex Networks (media) and Genius (website).
 Aaron Mansfield, editor at ESPN.
 Brian Josephs, editor at VICE News, writer featured in GQ, Billboard (Magazine) and Complex Networks (media).
 Ken Lovett, New York Daily News Albany bureau chief and former New York Post correspondent.
 Gary Stern, New York Journal News Editorial Board Leader and nationally recognized investigative reporter.
 Brenton Blanchet, writer featured in Billboard (Magazine) and Complex Networks (media)
 Hannah Stein, producer at Fox Business.

Awards
 2014 College Media Association National College Media Leader of the Year: Aaron Mansfield 
 2014 College Media Association Pinnacle Award, Best Collegiate Sports Columnist: Aaron Mansfield

 2013 Society of Professional Journalists Mark of Excellence, Sports Column Writing: Aaron Mansfield

 2013 Society of Professional Journalists Mark of Excellence, General News Reporting: Sam Fernando and Aaron Mansfield

 2013 Associated Collegiate Press Pacemaker, Sports Story of the Year -
"Lee, and they will follow" (By Aaron Mansfield)
 2012 Society of Professional Journalists Mark of Excellence, Sports Column Writing: Aaron Mansfield

 2012 Associated Collegiate Press Pacemaker, Sports Story of the Year - 
"The X-Files" (By Matt Parrino) 
 2012 College Media Association Runner-up, Best Student Media Leader: Matt Parrino - 
 2006 Columbia Scholastic Press Association Gold Circle/Collegiate Circle Award for Entertainment Reviews - 
Reggae with Chutzpah (by Alexander Nasarewsky)
 1972 Robert F. Kennedy Journalism Award Honorable Mention College -
"Health Care Crisis" (by Al Benson)

References

External links
The Spectrum (official site)

Student newspapers published in New York (state)
Publications established in 1950
1950 establishments in New York (state)
University at Buffalo